Moss-Man is a fictional character from the popular Masters of the Universe (MOTU) franchise.

As his name indicates, he is a man made of moss, whose power is to camouflage into foliage and other green areas (making him a useful spy), as well as control all plant life. He lives in the Evergreen Forest in harmony among the animals and plants.

Character history

1980s

Original figure
The Moss Man figure was first released in 1985, as part of the line's fourth wave of figures.

The figure is a green repaint of the Beast Man action figure, covered with fuzzy "moss" flocking, with the fangs painted over, and a pine scent added to the body. He has a brown mace that is a recast of a weapon from the original Castle Grayskull playset. With his added scent, he can in some ways be considered a Heroic counterpart to the Evil Warrior Stinkor, released in the same wave, who also had an added scent.

Examples of the Moss Man figure can be found both with hollow, 'squeezable' heads, as was common for earlier figures in the line, as well as more solid rubber heads, which became more common in the later days of the line.

Filmation cartoon series
Given that the accompanying cartoon series was drawing to a close at the time his toy was released, Moss Man's role in the cartoon is minimal and he appears in only two episodes: "Here, There, Skeletors Everywhere" and "The Ancient Mirror of Avathar". The former portrays him as a spy who can secretly observe danger by turning into a plant. The latter shows him using his abilities to rescue others by turning his arms into vines, as well as communicating with plants. He also has a non-speaking cameo appearance with a number of other lesser-seen characters in He-Man and She-Ra: A Christmas Special, where he appears in the background at Prince Adam and Princess Adora's birthday party.

2002 series
Moss Man features in the 2002 relaunch of Masters of the Universe as part of the cartoon series. He was not part of the new toy line, because it was cancelled before his figure could be released, although a limited edition figure was given away as a Mattel exclusive. As with the original figure, this was a repaint of the line's Beast Man figure, this time replacing the mace with a club that came with the line's Mekaneck figure.

The cartoon series depicts him as one of the most powerful beings on Eternia, possibly even more powerful than He-Man himself. He is introduced in the episode "Orko's Garden", in which he is an urban legend; an Eternian equivalent of the Green Man. He seems to be a kind of spirit who farmed and looked after the Eternian forestry and kept it in harmony. His rival in this episode is Evilseed, an evil counterpart who wants the plant world to overcome the human world. Moss Man's incredible powers help He-Man save the day, his power over all forms of vegetation able to overcome just about any obstacle. In a subsequent episode, "The Last Stand", he uses his abilities to save all the Masters from Skeletor's strongest trap yet. Given that he is so powerful, his appearances are sparse; only coming to the Masters' aid in times of desperation.

Masters of the Universe Classics
Moss Man was released on March 15 as the March 2010 Figure of the Month for the Masters of the Universe Classics line of action figures.  The figure includes two distinct head sculpts, one looking more like his 200x counterpart and the other like his 1980's Beast Man head (painted green & flocked). Originally, Mattel had reported that they had problems with the flocking – with the line's increased articulation, the flocking had caused some of the joins to cease. However, the final production figure was released with most of the body covered in "moss" flocking.

A variant of the figure with flocked ears was also released in small, limited quantities.

Masters of the Universe: Revelations

Moss Man has a cameo in the opening episode of Masters of the Universe: Revelations voiced by Alan Oppenheimer (Who voiced Skeletor and Man-at-Arms in the original series). When Moss Man is killed Skeletor remarks that his death 'smells like pine'.

Reception
Comic Book Resources listed the character as part of He-Man: 15 Most Powerful Masters of the Universe. CBR voted Moss-Man 7th worst He-Man toy.

Cracked thought poorly of Moss man. Moss man was voted 2nd out 7 in the 7 Stupidest He-Man Characters by Total Film.

References

Fictional characters introduced in 1984
Fictional anthropomorphic characters
Fictional humanoids
Fictional superorganisms
Extraterrestrial superheroes
Masters of the Universe Heroic Warriors
Plant characters
Male characters in animated series